The Evolution of the Philippine Flag is a set of flags consisting of select banners of the Katipunan of the Philippine Revolution. Often displayed with the flag of the First Republic, it is sometimes erroneously interpreted to imply the chronology of the national flag of the Philippines.

Background
The "Evolution of the Philippine Flag" is a set of various flags of the Katipunan revolutionary group of the Philippine Revolution. Three of the flags are organizational flags of the Katipunan, while others were personal flags or battle standards of Andres Bonifacio, Mariano Llanera, Pio del Pilar, and Gregorio del Pilar. The name of the set erroneously suggest that the modern Flag of the Philippines was derived or "evolved" from the flags used by the Katipunan and all of the flags themselves were national flags.

The Manila Historical Institute and the National Historical Institute had insisted that the flags in the set, excluding the modern Philippine flag, are "Flags of the Philippine Revolution". Historians also questioned the limited number of flags included in the set. It is pointed out that the "Evolution of the Philippine Flag" set only represents a small fraction of flags used by Katipunan battalions.

Flags

Discrepancies

The flag with the singular "K" is not part of the Bangko Sentral ng Pilipinas' version of the Evolution of Philippine Flag.

According to historian Xiao Chua, there is no evidence supporting the historical usage of three of the flags in the set namely the purpoted flags of the Magdiwang and Magdalo factions, as well as the red flag with a white anthropomorphic sun. Chua noted discrepancies such as the supposed Magdiwang flag sometimes attributed as the Magdalo flag. Chua states that a separate flag, not part of the set, was used for the first Tagalog Republic formed by the Katipunan, regardless of faction.

Usage 

The flags has been presented as the "Evolution of the Philippine Flag" as early as 1972 as part of a postal stamp series. The set were featured also featured during the Philippine Centennial celebration of 1998.

See also
Flags of the Philippine Revolution

References

External links
"The Evolution of the Philippine Flag." MSC's Philippine Centennial Celebration Website.
"History of the Philippine Flag."  National Commission for Culture and the Arts.

Flags of the Philippines
Flag controversies
Historical controversies
Controversies in the Philippines